Ellies Holdings Ltd is a diversified manufacturer and distributor of electronic products related to television reception including satellite and terrestrial aerial range. It is listed on the Main Board of the JSE, in the Electronic and Electrical Equipment Sector.

As a dominant distributor of TV aerials and installation equipment to the retail, furniture, hardware and independent market, Ellies is ideally positioned to capitalise on the ever increasing demand for these products in South Africa and into Africa too.
 
It is further involved in the manufacture and distribution of domestic and industrial audio electronic and electrical equipment under the 'Ellies' brands and satellite and associated equipment under the 'ElSat' brand. Through Megatron Federal, Ellies is involved in infrastructural power in the fields of power generation, transmission and distribution.
 
The company has also entered the renewable energy and Internet connectivity markets via satellite sectors through joint ventures with In-toto Technology Investments and Q-KON respectively.

News

Leading market commentators discuss Ellies on Stock Watch – 22 October 2013
Wayne Samson CEO Ellies on their recent results and green tech and new internet access - Maude Street Podcasts
Ellies Group releases annual results for the year ended 30 April 2011.
SkyeVine to provide New Dawn broadband - IT-Online
Ellies aims to make profit from solar power unit in six months - Bloomberg
Ellies' new growth drivers - Moneyweb
Ellies diluted earnings per share up - Business Report

Notable milestones
 25 September 2013 - Environmental Management System and Environmental Management Policy Published - read here
 29 October 2012 - First Annual Integrated Report, first step to delivering a fully integrated report
 26 November 2010 - Moved to the Main board on JSE
 2010 Financial Period - Issues maiden dividend
 2010 - Awarded Agency for Level1, Attac and Equip
 22 July 2009 - Altech UEC and Ellies enter into digital television distribution agreement
 2008 - Ellies Acquires Megatron Federal

References
 http://www.bdlive.co.za/business/technology/2014/01/21/ellies-earnings-dive-as-eskom-contract-ends

Electronics companies of South Africa
Companies listed on the Johannesburg Stock Exchange